This article lists the winners and nominees for the NAACP Image Award for Outstanding Gospel Artist. The award was first given during the 1980 ceremony and was later retired in 2009. During the years 2000 to 2002, the category was adjusted to award contemporary and traditional gospel artists separately. It was reverted in 2003. Since its conception, Kirk Franklin holds the record for most wins in this category with five. Yolanda Adams and CeCe Winans hold the record for the most wins in this category for female artists.

Winners and nominees
Winners are listed first and highlighted in bold.

1980s

1990s

2000s

Multiple wins and nominations

Wins

 5 wins
 Kirk Franklin

 4 wins
 Yolanda Adams
 BeBe and CeCe Winans

Nominations

 6 nominations
 Kirk Franklin

 5 nominations
 Yolanda Adams
 CeCe Winans

 4 nominations
 BeBe and CeCe Winans

 3 nominations
 Mary Mary

 2 nominations
 Shirley Caesar
 Donnie McClurkin
 Vickie Winans

References

NAACP Image Awards